Hsin-Chien Huang (traditional Chinese: 黃心健 born 13 January 1966 in Taipei) is an artist and director working in mixed media. Science, technology, new media, programming, and algorithms are tools he uses to bring the universe of his imagination to life. He served as artistic director for SEGA and Sony.  Huang collaborated with pioneering American media artist Laurie Anderson on their VR work La Camera Insabbiata/Chalkroom which won the Best VR experience Award at the 74th Venice International Film Festival(it was the first edition of the festival that introduced its virtual-reality section); he also designed her 1995 CD-ROM, Puppet Motel. His work Bodyless was also nominated in the 76th of the festival. In 2011，Huang received the "Pride of Taiwan" honor from president of Taiwan Ma Ying-jeou.

He founded Storynest Studio after 2001, which engaged in artistic creation and commercial design. Huang is currently a distinguished professor at National Taiwan Normal University.

His VR film Samsara won the 2021 SXSW Jury Award.

Early life 
At the age of four, the cornea of Hsin-Chien Huang's right eye was damaged so badly he was practically blind in that eye, his vision only returning after receiving a donated cornea at age 14. He lacked depth perception in the interim, so seeing things "properly" has since felt like a luxury to him.

Huang's mother is the eminent oil painter, Lee Lan. Raised in an artistic environment, Huang was given his first computer, an Apple II, when he was in senior high school. Since that time, programming language has become his second language.

After graduating from college in Taiwan with a degree in mechanical engineering, he went on to earn a bachelor's degree in product design from the Art Center College of Design in Pasadena, followed by a master's degree from the Institute of Design at Chicago's Illinois Institute of Technology.

Artwork

Exhibitions 
 2022 - 'Hsin-Chien Huang: The Data We Called Home' at Pratt Gallery - New York, the States
 2022 - 'Being X: Hsin-Chien Huang's Metaverse Theater' at Kaohsiung Museum of Fine Arts - Kaohsiung, Taiwan
 2020 - "Out of the window" International Exhibition Produced by Taoyuan Museum of Fine Arts & Centraal Museum Utrecht - Taoyuan, Taiwan
2020 - "In the name of tree" Art Museum of National Taiwan Normal University - Taipei, Taiwan
2020 - "RE:Human Touch- A Closer Future" Taiwan Creative Content Agency - Taipei, Taiwan
2019 - "Immersive Interactive Unit" International Documentary Filmfestival Amsterdam - Amsterdam, Netherlands
2019 - "Vortex Program" Laboratorio de Electrónica Visual L.E.V. Festival - Madrid, Spain
2019 - "Every step in the right direction" Singapore Art Museum - Singapore, Singapore
2019 - "Our Moon. Longing, Art and Science" Naturhistorisches Museum Wien - Vienna, Austria
2017 - "La Camera Insabbiata/Chalkroom" Taipei Fine Arts Museum - Taipei, Taiwan
2014 - "Thus have I remembered, once my mind was free" Cathay Gallery - Taipei, Taiwan
2008 - "The art of mortal apparatus" Taipei Fine Arts Museum - Taipei, Taiwan

Collaboration 

 2010 Taipei International Flora Exposition: Hall Design (2019)
 Expo 2010 Shanghai China: Interactive Device (2010)
 Incomparable concert Jay Chou: Audio Visual Design (2004)
 Puppet Motel: Designer of the music/art CD-ROM by Laurie Anderson (1995)

Awards

Publications 

 The Color Devourer 2016. 
Technology Mirage 2013. ISBN 9862134224
Pictographic Labyrinth 2003. ISBN 9789574113088

References 

Living people
Taiwanese artists
Modern artists
Virtual reality
1966 births